Ian John Shearer (10 December 1941 – 1 June 2021) was a New Zealand politician of the National Party, environmentalist and research scientist.

Early life and education
Shearer was born at Whakatāne in 1941, the son of Jack Sewell Shearer. He received his education from Whakatane Primary and Whakatane High School. He completed bachelors and masters degrees at Massey University in agricultural science and a PhD in reproductive physiology at the University of Nottingham.

Career
Shearer spent nine years as an animal scientist at the Ruakura Research Centre before becoming a member of parliament in 1975.

Under Robert Muldoon, he was Minister for the Environment, Minister of Science and Technology, and Minister of Broadcasting.

In 1985, Shearer publicly questioned the National Party on membership and finances, which resulted in the suspension of his membership in October of that year. Although the suspension was lifted, Shearer resigned all his party roles in December 1985. He later joined the New Zealand First Party which was largely made up of National Party dissidents and stood as the New Zealand First candidate in the Onehunga electorate at the 1993 general election, losing to Labour's Richard Northey.

After leaving politics Shearer was the dean of science and engineering at the Auckland University of Technology for nine years and served on the Waitangi Tribunal. He retired from public service in 2005.

He published his autobiography The Boy from the Bay in 2006.

Personal life 
Shearer was married twice, firstly to Sandra May Griffiths, the daughter of Ivor David Griffiths on 5 December 1964, and secondly to Cheryl.  He and Sandra had one son and one daughter.

Shearer died from idiopathic pulmonary fibrosis at his home in Whakatāne on 1 June 2021.

Publications 
 The Boy from the Bay: an autobiography (2006)
 Whakatāne Hospital, Te Whatumauri Hauora : a history (2011)
 Ōwhakatoro : Sisam & Sons : from Clydesdales to computers (2013) – with Barrie Macdonald
 A century on Cameron Road : a history of Tauranga Hospital, 1914–2014 (2016) – with Dr Rex E Wright-St Clair
 Family – the Shearers of Ōkaiawa : the history of a pioneer family (2018)
 The adventures of Slim Jim (2020)
 Antarctica twice, and related issues (2020)

Notes

References

|-

1941 births
2021 deaths
New Zealand National Party MPs
New Zealand First politicians
Members of the Cabinet of New Zealand
People educated at Whakatane High School
Unsuccessful candidates in the 1984 New Zealand general election
Unsuccessful candidates in the 1993 New Zealand general election
Members of the New Zealand House of Representatives
New Zealand MPs for North Island electorates
People from Whakatāne
Massey University alumni
Alumni of the University of Nottingham
Deaths from pulmonary fibrosis